Nedre Heimdalsvatn is a lake in Vågå Municipality in Innlandet county, Norway. It is located in the far eastern edge of the Jotunheimen mountain range. The southern end of the lake forms the municipal boundary between Vågå and Øystre Slidre.

See also
List of lakes in Norway

References

Vågå
Lakes of Innlandet